Indian Telly Award for Best Actress in a Negative Role is an award given by Indiantelevision.com as part of its annual Indian Telly Awards for TV serials, to recognize a female actor who has delivered an outstanding performance in a negative role, that is in the role of an antagonist.

The award was first awarded in 2002. Since 2005, the award has been separated in two categories, Jury Award and Popular Award. Winner of Jury award is chosen by the jury of critics assigned to the function while Popular Award is given on the basis of public voting.

Urvashi Dholakia, Meghna Malik and Hina Khan are the only actresses who have won both Popular and Jury awards.

Superlatives

Popular Awards

2001-2009
2001 Not Awarded
2002 Shweta Kawatra - Kahaani Ghar Ghar Ki as Pallavi Aggrawal
Shweta Keswani - Des Mein Niklla Hoga Chand as Anu
Urvashi Dholakia - Kasautii Zindagii Kay as Komoolika
Sudha Chandran - Kaahin Kissii Roz as Ramola Sikand
Jaya Bhattacharya - Kyunki Saas Bhi Kabhi Bahu Thi as Payal
2003 Urvashi Dholakia - Kasautii Zindagii Kay as Komolika
Shweta Kawatra - Kahaani Ghar Ghar Ki as Pallavi Aggrawal
Sudha Chandran - Kaahin Kissii Roz as Ramola Sikand
Mandira Bedi - Kyunki Saas Bhi Kabhi Bahu Thi as Mandira
Shweta Keswani - Des Mein Niklla Hoga Chand as Anu
2004 Urvashi Dholakia - Kasautii Zindagii Kay as Komolika
Tanaaz Currim  - Yeh Meri Life Hai as Jayshree Bua
Rupali Ganguly - Sanjivani - A Medical Boon as Dr. Simran
Grusha Kapoor - Kehta Hai Dil as Lalita Devi 
Shweta Kawatra - Kahaani Ghar Ghar Ki as Pallavi Aggrawal
Sudha Chandran - Kaahin Kissii Roz as Ramola Sikand
2005 Rakshanda Khan - Jassi Jaissi Koi Nahin as Mallika (tied with) Urvashi Dholakia - Kasautii Zindagii Kay as Komolika
Amrita Singh - Kkavyanjali as Nitya Nanda
Tasneem Sheikh - Kyunki Saas Bhi Kabhi Bahu Thi as Mohini
Poonam Narula - Kkusum as Mahi
2006 Ashwini Kalsekar - Kasamh Se as Jigyasaa Bali
Arzoo Gowitrikar - Ek Ladki Anjaani Si as Tulika Samarth
Urvashi Dholakia - Kasautii Zindagii Kay as Komolika
Aanchal Dwivedi - Saat Phere: Saloni Ka Safar as Kaveri
Navneet Nishan - Kyaa Hoga Nimmo Kaa as Parminder
2007 Kamya Panjabi - Banoo Main Teri Dulhann as Sindoora
Suvarna Jha - Kyunki Saas Bhi Kabhi Bahu Thi as Trupti
Nimisha Vakharia - Teen Bahuraaniyaan as Kokila
Aruna Irani - Maayka - Saath Zindagi Bhar Ka as Durga
Urvashi Dholakia - Kasautii Zindagii Kay as Komolika
Karishma Tanna - Ek Ladki Anjaani Si as Ayesha
 Moonmoon Banerjee -  Kasautii Zindagii Kay as Sampada
Ashwini Kalsekar - Kasamh Se as Jigyasaa
Sanjeeda Sheikh - Kayamath as Ayesha
2008 Surekha Sikri - Balika Vadhu as Kalyani Devi
Kamya Panjabi - Banoo Main Teri Dulhann as Sindoora
Sanjeeda Sheikh - Kayamath as Ayesha
Suvarna Jha - Kyunki Saas Bhi Kabhi Bahu Thi as Tripti 
Pallavi Subhash Shirke - Kasamh Se as Meera
2009 Meghna Malik - Na Aana Is Des Laado as Ammaji
Surekha Sikri - Balika Vadhu as Kalyani Devi
Rashami Desai - Uttaran as Tapasya
Rasika Joshi - Bandini as Tarulata/Motiben
Sushmita Mukherjee - Agle Janam Mohe Bitiya Hi Kijo as Gangiya

2010-present 

2010 Rashami Desai - Uttaran as Tapasya
Parvati Sehgal - Mann Kee Awaaz Pratigya as Komal
Hunar Hali - 12/24 Karol Bagh as Mili 
Surekha Sikri - Balika Vadhu as Kalyani Devi
Meghna Malik - Na Aana Is Des Laado as Ammaji 
Sushmita Mukherjee - Agle Janam Mohe Bitiya Hi Kijo as Gangiya
2011 No Award
2012 Kanika Maheshwari - Diya Aur Baati Hum as Meenakshi Vikram Rathi
Usha Nadkarni - Pavitra Rishta as Savita Damodar Deshmukh
Eva Grover - Bade Achhe Lagte Hain as Niharika Kapoor
Mona Vasu - Parichay—Nayee Zindagi Kay Sapno Ka as Richa Thakral 
Shivshakti Sachdev - Afsar Bitiya as Pinky Raj
2013 Aanchal Khurana - Sapne Suhane Ladakpan Ke as Charu Mayank Garg
Jyotsana Chandola - Sasural Simar Ka as Billo
Mouli Ganguly - Kya Huaa Tera Vaada as Anushka Bhalla
Adaa Khan - Amrit Manthan as Amrit Kaur Sodi
Seema Mishra - Madhubala - Ek Ishq Ek Junoon as Deepali Bhatia
2014 Ashwini Kalsekar - Jodha Akbar as Mahamanga (tied with) Simone Singh - Ek Hasina Thi as Sakshi Goenka
Aashka Goradia - Bharat Ka Veer Putra – Maharana Pratap as Maharani
Monica Bedi - Saraswatichandra as Ghuman
Nigaar Khan - Main Naa Bhoolungi as Madhurima Aditya Jagannath
Anita Hassanandani Reddy - Yeh Hai Mohabbatein as Shagun Arora
2015 Shraddha Arya - Dream Girl as Ayesha
Shweta Tiwari - Begusarai as Bindia
Tejaswi Prakash Wayangankar -Swaragini as Ragini
Anita Hassanandani - Yeh Hai Mohabbatein as Shagun
Additi Gupta - Qubool Hai as Sanam
2016 No Award
2017 No Award
2018 No Award
2019 Hina Khan - Kasautii Zindagii Kay as Komolika
Parineeta Borthakur - Bepannah as Anjana Hooda
 Antara Biswas - Nazar as Mohna
 Shubhavi Choksey - Kasautii Zindagii Kay (2018) as Mohini Basu
 Aalisha Panwar - Ishq Mein Marjawan as Tara Raichand
 Anjali Anand - Kullfi Kumarr Bajewala as Lovely Singh
 Reyhna Malhotra - Manmohini as Mohini
Gauri Pradhan - Tu Aashiqui as Anita Sharma
Leena Jumani - Kumkum Bhagya as Tanushree Mehta

Jury Award

2005-2009 

2005 Amrita Singh - Kkavyanjali as Nitya Nanda
2006 Urvashi Dholakia - Kasautii Zindagii Kay as Komolika
2007 Urvashi Dholakia - Kasautii Zindagii Kay as Komolika
2008 Not Awarded
2009 No Awarded

2010-present 
2010 Meghna Malik - Na Aana Is Des Laado as Ammaji
 (No prior nominations)
2011 No Award
2012 Asmita Sharma - Mann Kee Awaaz Pratigya as Sumitra Thakur
Usha Nadkarni - Pavitra Rishta as Savita Deshmukh
Sushmita Mukherjee - Ek Nayi Chhoti Si Zindagi as Devki
Pratima Kazmi - Uttaran as Sumitra Devi
Sheeba Chaddha - Na Aana Is Des Laado as Bajri
Aashka Goradia - Laagi Tujhse Lagan as Kalavati
2013 Adaa Khan - Amrit Manthan as Amrit Kaur Sodi
Krutika Desai - Uttaran as Ekadashi Avinash Chatterjee
Pratima Kazmi - Uttaran as Sumitra Devi (Nani)
Asmita Sharma - Mann Kee Awaaz Pratigya as Sumitra Thakur
Alka Kaushal - Qubool Hai as Raziya Mumani
2014 Nigaar Khan - Main Naa Bhoolungi as Madhurima Jagannath
Krutika Desai - Uttaran as Ekadashi Chatterjee
Pratima Kazmi - Uttaran as Nani
Nigaar Khan - Buddha - Rajaon Ka Raja as Mangala
Shivani Tanksale - 24 (Indian TV series) as Divya Maurya
2019 Hina Khan - Kasautii Zindagii Kay 2 as Komolika

References

Indian Telly Awards